Bybee is a former settlement in Fulton County, Illinois, United States.

The community was laid out by David Bybee on a narrow gauge railway: probably the Fulton County Narrow Gauge Railroad that operated from 1880 to the 1920s. That railway was converted into standard gauge c. 1910. In 1905, two trains per day passed through Bybee; by 1913, only one train a day. There was a school, store, and train stop on the narrow gauge rail. There is a small cemetery near where this community formerly existed. The track was removed from this area when the narrow gauge company discontinued service between Galesburg and Fairview.

See also
 List of ghost towns in Illinois

References

Bibliography
 Callary, Edward (2009) Place Names of Illinois Urbana & Chicago; University of Illinois Press. 

Geography of Fulton County, Illinois
Ghost towns in Illinois